Western United FC is a Solomon Islands football club based in Honiara, which plays in the Telekom S-League. The club is franchised by Reginald Douglas & Choylin Douglas of Douglas Concrete Ltd. Douglas Concrete is a sub company of Dalgro SI Ltd operating in Solomon Islands in engineering and construction.

Achievements
2011 Telekom S-League, 4th
2012 Telekom S-League, 2nd
2013/14 Telekom S-League, 3rd
2014/15 Telekom S-League, Champion
2015 International Friendly, Western United defeated Hekari FC, Champions  of P.N.G by 3 goals to nil at Lawson Tama Stadium.

Current squad
Squad for the 2018 Solomon Islands S-League

Former players

  Fabrizio Pratticò

Current technical staff

References

Football clubs in the Solomon Islands
Honiara